Laura Dave (born July 18, 1977) is an American novelist.

Early life
Dave was born in New York City and grew up in Scarsdale, New York. Her interest in writing began when she was in elementary school. Dave graduated from the University of Pennsylvania in 1999, where she received a B.A. in English. She has an MFA from the University of Virginia's creative writing program. She was a Henry Hoyns Fellow and a recipient of the Tennessee Williams Scholarship. She received several awards for her writing including the AWP Intro Award in Short Fiction.

Following graduate school, Dave worked as a freelance journalist for ESPN.

Writing career
Dave is the author of London Is The Best City In America (2006) and The Divorce Party (2008).  Her most recent novel, The Last Thing He Told Me, was released in 2021 and became an instant #1 New York Times Bestseller, remaining on the NYT hardcover bestsellers list for 65 weeks. Dave's fiction and essays have been published in The New York Times, The New York Observer, ESPN, Redbook, and The Huffington Post. She most often writes about relationships, family, infidelity, and marriage. She has appeared on CBS's The Early Show, Fox News Channel's Fox & Friends and NPR's All Things Considered. In 2008, Cosmopolitan named her a "Fun and Fearless Phenom of the Year."

Personal life
Dave is married to screenwriter Josh Singer. They reside in Los Angeles.

Works

Novels
London Is The Best City In America (2006) 
The Divorce Party (2008) 
The First Husband (2011) 
Eight Hundred Grapes (2015) 
Hello, Sunshine (2017) 
The Last Thing He Told Me (2021)

Film options
In 2006, Universal Studios optioned the rights to London Is The Best City In America as a starring vehicle for Reese Witherspoon. In 2008, Universal Studios also optioned The Divorce Party in conjunction with Echo Films, Jennifer Aniston's production company. In 2020, Reese Witherspoon's Hello Sunshine optioned 'The Last Thing He Told Me' to be produced as a limited series on Apple starring Jennifer Garner.

References

External links
 

1977 births
Living people
21st-century American novelists
University of Pennsylvania alumni
People from Scarsdale, New York
American women novelists
21st-century American women writers
University of Virginia alumni
Writers from New York City
Scarsdale High School alumni
Novelists from New York (state)